Marvin is the surname of:

People

Cal Marvin (1924–2004), American ice hockey player
Carolyn Marvin, American author
Charles Marvin (disambiguation), multiple people
Edith Marvin (1872–1958), British civil servant
Edward Marvin (1878–1918), English-South African cricketer
Frederick Marvin (1920–2017), American pianist
Gigi Marvin (born 1987), American ice hockey player
Hank Marvin (born 1941), British musician
James Marvin (disambiguation), multiple people
John Marvin (disambiguation), multiple people
Junior Marvin (born 1949), Jamaican guitarist
Lee Marvin (1924–1987), American actor
Mia Marvin (1904–1992), American actress
Michelle Triola Marvin (1932–2009), American actress
Nathaniel C. Marvin (1826–1895), American politician
Matthew Marvin (disambiguation), multiple people
Richard Marvin (disambiguation), multiple people
Rolland B. Marvin (1897–1979), American politician
Samuel Marvin (1664–1754), English politician

See also
Marvin (given name), a page for people with the given name "Marvin
Senator Marvin (disambiguation), a disambiguation page of Senators with the surname "Marvin"